Hermansky–Pudlak syndrome 5 protein is a protein that in humans is encoded by the HPS5 gene.

This gene encodes a protein that may play a role in organelle biogenesis associated with melanosomes, platelet dense granules, and lysosomes. This protein interacts with Hermansky–Pudlak syndrome 6 protein and may interact with the cytoplasmic domain of integrin, alpha-3. Mutations in this gene are associated with Hermansky–Pudlak syndrome type 5. Multiple transcript variants encoding two distinct isoforms have been identified for this gene.

References

External links
  GeneReviews/NCBI/NIH/UW entry on Hermansky–Pudlak syndrome

Further reading